Nemesis is an inverted roller coaster located at the Alton Towers theme park in England. Manufactured by Bolliger & Mabillard, the ride was designed by Werner Stengel in collaboration with attraction developer John Wardley. It opened in the Forbidden Valley area of the park on 19 March 1994.

The four-inversion roller coaster was one of the first Bolliger & Mabillard rides to be installed outside of the United States and the first in Europe as an independent company. Following the 2022 season, the ride is scheduled for a major refurbishment and will be closed until 2024.

History

Development history
In 1990, Alton Towers added the Thunder Looper roller coaster; the addition was only temporary due to planning restrictions imposed on its installation. The park began planning for a new roller coaster on unused land adjacent to Thunder Looper. They desired a roller coaster that was big, different and exciting, but they were constrained by the tree-level height limit imposed on the park.

Alton Towers approached Arrow Dynamics for the new roller coaster. The Utah-based company was working on a prototype of a pipeline roller coaster, similar to TOGO's Ultratwister design. John Wardley proposed the concept for a ride themed as a secret military weapon, codenamed "Secret Weapon". A year later, a revised layout was drawn up, dubbed "Secret Weapon 2". Rock blasting was used to excavate space for the planned ride. However, the Arrow pipeline project was cancelled when Wardley rode the prototype, describing how it was "very slow (and rather boring), looked cumbersome, and was very energy inefficient". The park began to look for an alternative.

Tussauds became aware of a new roller coaster model being built by Bolliger & Mabillard at Six Flags Great America and entered into discussions with Six Flags, who agreed to privately disclose information about the new ride. Jim Wintrode, the general manager of Six Flags Great America at the time, proposed the concept of an inverted roller coaster that featured inversions and worked with Bolliger & Mabillard to develop Batman: The Ride. Tussauds directors rode Batman: The Ride prior to its May 1992 opening and wanted to add a similar ride to Alton Towers.

The inverted roller coaster, now dubbed "Secret Weapon 3", was planned throughout 1992. John Wardley and Nick Varney, marketing director of Alton Towers, came up with the theme for "Nemesis" as an alien creature excavated from the ground. Wardley drafted the ride layout, from which the coaster was designed by Werner Stengel. Tussauds collaborated with a landscape architect to design the excavated area, to create a ride that could be exciting for both riders and non-riders; for example, the final inversion was built at the eye level of an observer and the queue makes its way all the way around the ride area.

Operational history
The £10 million Nemesis officially opened to the public on 19 March 1994, following a soft opening three days prior. It opened as one of the first Bolliger & Mabillard rides to be installed outside of the United States, along with Diavlo at Himeji Central Park, Japan, which opened four months later.

In August 2004, Nemesis gained the Guinness World Record for the "Most Naked People on a Rollercoaster". The ride set the record at 32 riders – the number of seats on a single Nemesis train. It took the record from Thorpe Park's Nemesis Inferno roller coaster which set the record at 28 just three months prior. The ride lost the record in 2010 when 40 naked riders boarded Green Scream Rollercoaster at Adventure Island.

In 2009, Alton Towers received several complaints from nearby residents regarding increased noise levels emitted from the ride. New wheels had to be installed on the two trains before the ride returned to normal operation.

Retracking

In January 2022, Alton Towers submitted a now-successful application proposing that the majority of the rollercoaster be retracked for maintenance reasons, including replacing 89 of the 117 support columns. The replacement track will be sand-filled to reduce noise levels—a now standard feature was not widely used in B&M roller coasters at time of Nemesis' original construction.

It was announced on 21 September that Nemesis would be closing on 6 November 2022. It has been announced to be closed throughout the 2023 season, reopening in 2024 for the ride’s 30th year.

Characteristics

The four inversions include two corkscrews, a zero-g roll, and a vertical loop. Riders experience approximately 3.5 times the force of gravity on the 1-minute, 20-second ride. Nemesis operates with two steel and fiberglass trains, each containing eight cars. Each car seats four riders in a single row for a total of 32 riders per train.

Ride experience

Riders enter the station and choose between the standard queue or front row (which adds significant queuing time). Riders are batched into rows of 4. Once the train is ready for dispatch the floor beneath it is lowered before the train then departs the station making a 45-degree, right-hand turn towards the lift hill. Once at the top of the  hill, the train makes a small dip and turns around 180 degrees to the left. The train then descends down a small drop into the first inversion, a right-handed corkscrew. The train then navigates a right-handed, 270-degree downward helix that features 90 degree banking and then the train rises up into the second inversion, a zero-g roll, where riders experience the feeling of weightlessness. It then makes a 180-degree right-handed stall turn into the third inversion, a vertical loop. After a left stall turn the train enters the second corkscrew. The train then passes through an underground tunnel, and through one more 180-degree turn, before being stopped by the brake run and returning to the station.

The ride is themed to an unknown creature, possibly ancient and alien, which has been discovered or excavated from the ground. The surrounding area scenery suggests a scrapyard with a possible cult worship presence. The station building is themed as the carcass of the creature.

Reception
Nemesis received positive reception by park visitors and the attraction industry as a whole since its opening. More than 50 million people have ridden Nemesis since opening. In Amusement Today'''s annual Golden Ticket Awards, Nemesis has consistently ranked highly. It is also one of only seven roller coasters to appear in the top 50 every year since the award's inception in 1998. It debuted at position 10 in 1998, before peaking at position 7 in 2003.

Two further rides with the Nemesis brand were later opened at Merlin Entertainments theme parks. The first was Nemesis Inferno at Thorpe Park, another Bolliger & Mabillard inverted roller coaster. The ride opened in 2003. Alton Towers hosted the second related ride, Nemesis: Sub-Terra. The drop tower opened on the former Dynamo site in 2012 and is currently closed.

Nemesis has ranked favourably in Amusement Todays annual Golden Ticket Awards, being one of only seven roller coasters to appear in the top 50 steel roller coasters for all 15 years. Nemesis Inferno has never made an appearance. In a poll conducted by the Los Angeles Times'', Nemesis received 37.93% of the vote for title of best roller coaster in England, while Nemesis Inferno received 0.32%.

References

External links

 
 

Alton Towers
Inverted roller coasters
Roller coasters in the United Kingdom
Roller coasters introduced in 1994
Roller coasters manufactured by Bolliger & Mabillard
Roller coasters operated by Merlin Entertainments
Steel roller coasters
Rides designed by John Wardley
Inverted roller coasters manufactured by Bolliger & Mabillard